The Namibia National Front (NNF) was an alliance of nationalist but moderate parties in Namibia. It was formed in 1977 as a merger of the Namibia National Convention (which had been marginalized after SWAPO's departure from it) and the Namibia National Council.

At the time of its formation NNF consisted of the following groups:
 Damara Council
 Damara Executive Committee
 Federal Party
 South West African National Union
 Mbanderu Council
 Namibia Progressive Party
 Namibia Independence Party
 Voice of the People Party

In 1978 some groups left NNF to form Namibia People's Liberation Front.

The NNF contested the elections for the Constituent Assembly of Namibia in 1989 and won one seat which was taken by Vekuii Rukoro.

References

1977 establishments in South West Africa
Defunct political parties in Namibia
Political parties established in 1977
Political party alliances in Namibia